William Beardmore may refer to:
 William Beardmore, 1st Baron Invernairn, British industrialist
 William Beardmore and Company
 William Beardmore (cricketer), Scottish cricketer and British Army officer